Department of Correctional Services may refer to:

 Department of Correctional Services (South Africa)
 Department of Correctional Services, Jamaica
 New York State Department of Correctional Services

See also
 Department for Correctional Services, South Australia
 Department of Corrections, U.S. departments